Ligugé is a commune in the Vienne department in the Nouvelle-Aquitaine region in western France.

It is known for its historic monastery, Ligugé Abbey.

Twin towns – sister cities
Ligugé is twinned with:
 Sonning, United Kingdom

Population

See also
Communes of the Vienne department

References

External links

 Das Village d'Art et d'Histoire — Ligugé 
 Saint-Martin's Abbey, Ligugé including information in English
 Office Tourisme Ligugé 

Communes of Vienne